This is a List of compositions by Yehuda Yannay

Solo 
Twelve Monophonic Dances for any wind instrument (1958)
Music for Piano (1962)
Permutations for solo percussion (1964)
Statement for flute (1964)
Continuum for piano Op. 15 (1966)
Coloring Book for the Harpist (1969)
Seven Late Spring Pieces for piano (1973)
Im Silberwald (In the Silver Forest) for trombone, glass harmonica and tape (1983)
Between the Raindrops for solo guitar (1984)
Tangoul Mortii (Tango of Death) for contrabass solo (1996)
Tangoul Mortii (Tango of Death) version for cello solo (1997)
Tangoul Mortii (Tango of Death) version for viola solo (1997)
Piano Portfolio I for solo piano (1994–2000)
The One-Legged Dancer for toy piano (accordion or harpsichord (2001)
Three Organic Pieces for organ (2004)
Hornology for horn (2004)
Piano Transplant (co-composed with Josh Schmidt) (2004)
Double Transplant for piano (2004)
Three Postcards from Paris for piano, an excerpt from Midwest Mythologist (2012)
Incipit Vita Nova for accordion (2013)
The Exquisite Viola for viola solo (2013)
Bits into Pieces for piano and iPad electronics (2014)

Chamber music 
Variations for 2 flutes (1960)
Interconnections for 14 instruments (1965)
Random Rotated for 4 wind instruments (1965)
Two Fragments for violin and piano (1966)
Mutatis Mutandis for 6 players (1968)
Per Se, chamber concerto for violin and 7 instruments (1969)
preFIX-FIX-sufFIX for bassoon, horn and cello (1971)
Squares & Symbols, Exits and Traps for keyboard and 1 to 3 wind and/or strings (1971)
Bug Piece with live insect notation (1972)
The Hidden Melody (Nigun Haganuz) for cello and French horn (1977)
Brazilian Birdwhistle Event for Brazilian bird-whistle set (1980)
Trio, for clarinet, cello and piano (1982)
Three Jazz Moods, for solo trumpet and saxophone, and chamber ensemble with rhythm section (1982)
Nine Branches of the Olive Tree, for recorders, bass clarinet, guitar and percussion (1984)
M. My Dear, a ballad for jazz violin, guitar and bass (1985)
Duo for flute and cello (1991)
Five Pieces for Three Players for soprano saxophone, clarinet and marimba (1994)
Playing for Peace for three-part violin ensemble (1994)
Loose Connections for violin, clarinet and double bass (1996)
Marrakesh Bop for microtonal flute and guitar (1999)
Trio for violin, cello and piano (2001)
My Main Squeeze for trumpet, accordion and cello (2000)
Visions of Y for viola and piano (2002)
Psalm for a melody instrument and piano, completion of an unfinished composition by Alexander  U. Boskovich (2006)
Bayannayab (Choral) for two bayans or accordions (2006)
Note Traffic for violin and cello (2008)
Bayanette for two bayans (accordions) and piano (2009)
Suite for mandolin and accordion (2011)
Two Alleys in Old Tel-Aviv for string quartet (2013)
Aprés Rameau: Les Poulets de Mequon/The Chickens of Mequon for 2 pianos (2013)
Aprés Rameau: Les Poulets de Mequon/The Chickens of Mequon for bayan (accordion) and piano (2014)
Summer Ostinato for two accordions (2015)
Tandem Piece for horn and accordion or accordion and piano (2015)
The Center Does Not Hold for saxophone quartet (2016)

Chamber music with voice 
Rubayat, song for voice and cello, text: Omar Khayyam (1958)
Spheres for soprano and 10 instruments, text: Yehuda Amichai (1963)
Incantations for voice, keyboard, and interior piano, text: W.H.Auden (1964)
Foregroundmusic for 6 instruments and speaker, for a poem by A. Ginsberg (1965)
At the End of the Parade, six poems by William Carlos Williams for baritone and six players (1974).
Eros Reminisced, song cycle for singer/pianist, text: Constantine P. Cavafy (1981)
"Augentanz" (Eyedance) and "Galgenlied" (Hangman's Song) from Celan Ensembles for tenor and instruments, text Paul Celan (1986)
"In Madness There Is Order" from Celan Ensembles, for voice, projections and synthesizers, text: Paul Celan (1988)
"Spiegeltanz" (Mirrordance) from Celan Ensembles, for voice, horn, and 2 marimbas, text: Paul Celan (1989)
The Bogen Songs, six pieces for voice, flute, clarinet in B, violoncello and accordion, text: Don Bogen (2010)

Orchestra and concertante 
Mirkamim, textures of sound for large orchestra, (1967)
Concerto for Audience and Orchestra, with audience operated portable radios (1971)
Five Songs for Tenor and Orchestra text: W.C. Williams.  (1976–77)
Seven Late Spring Pieces for Orchestra (1979)
Concertino for Violin and Chamber Orchestra (1980)
Exit Music At Century's End for chamber orchestra (1995)
Piano Concerto for solo piano and 15 instruments (2002)
Rhapsody for alto saxophone and wind ensemble (2005)
Nuances Argentées (Shades of Silver) for recorded voice and flute orchestra of 24 players  (2006)
Plus Avec Moins (PAM) – More From Less(MFL) for solo accordion and 24 flutes (2012)

Choir 
Mishnayot for solo voices and choir, text: Jewish prayer book (1961).
Psukey Dezimra for solo voices and choir, text: Jewish prayer book (1961)
The Chain of Proverbs cantata for youth, text: Ibn Zabara (1962)
Coheleth, environment with mobile choir, microphones, wireless microphones and voice controlled filters, text: Ecclesiastes (1970)
Dawn for mixed choir, text: Arthur Rimbaud (1970)
Departure for nine voices and five instruments, text: Arthur Rimbaud (1972)
A Noiseless Patient Spider for women's choir or eight solo voices, text: Walt Whitman (1975)
Tombeau de Satie in memory of Thomas Trobaugh, text: Dona Nobis Pacem (1979)
Le Campane di Leopardi for mixed choir and tuned glasses, text: Giacomo Leopardi (1979)
Yigdal for cantor and choir followed by an organ variation, text: Hebrew prayer book (1985)
Three Hebrew Aphorisms from the Mishna and the Talmud for five-part unaccompanied mixed choir (2007)
The Wheel of Light(Galgal Haorot) for three choral or solo voices, text: Rabbi Naftali Hertz of Bacharach (2014)
Mayeem (Water) for five-part mixed chorus (SSATB), harmonicas and Melodicas (2016)

Theater pieces and dance 
Wraphap a theatre piece for actress, amplified aluminum sheet and Yannachord (1969)
Houdini's Ninth, a theatre piece for a double bass and escape artist (1969)
The Urbana (IL) Christal Lake Park Gathering for any number of mallet players (1968)
Autopiano, or Piano Minus Pianist for an actor and piano (1970)
The Vestibule Peep-In-Pipe-Out for a caged performer with an FM transmitter (1970)
Attic Songs and Betweens, electronic music for dance (1975)
American Sonorama, music for a ballet by Anna Nassif (1975–76)
The Decline and Fall of the Sonata in B-flat, a musicule for actors and pianists (1970–76)
Three Michael and Nancy Pieces for dancer and percussion (1978)
Genesis, music for a dance piece by Anna Nassif (1979)
All Our Women, chamber opera, text: Yehuda Yannay (1981)
Tableau One:  "...in sleep one often finds solutions..." (from Journey to Orgonon) for actor, projections and synthesizers (1992)
Go Fearing for solo voice for "Geometry of Aloneness," a multimedia work by Marie Mellott (1996)
"Traum ist von Tat nicht so verschieden..." (Dream and action are not so apart...) for tape and speaker (1998)
Insomnia in Havana, a theater piece for percussionist/actor, live electronics and projections, text: Virgilio Piñera (2005)
Midwest Mythologist, theater piece for a pianist, text and musical sources:Steve Nelson-Raney (2012)
Beware of Poison Mushrooms!  Seven Illustrated Aphorisms and Short Stories by Roland Lampe (2013)

Film, video, intermedia 
Houdini's Ninth – a film.  black and white and color, 16 mm film with sound produced in collaboration with Emory J. Clark (1973)
Charcoal and Pastel Music 1 to 52 visual music in form of a series of drawings (1979)
Jidyll, a film with music by Dick Blau and Yehuda Yannay (1984–90)
Windsuck, sound sculpture created in collaboration with Steve Pevnick (1985)
The Oranur Experiment  Part I:  "Journey to Orgonon", a music video, in collaboration with Jerome Fortier (1991)
Violoncello Solo for "I can't fathom it"  for projection theater by Marie Mellott (1993)
Wilhelm Reich: Journey to Orgonon a documentary opera on CD-ROM in collaboration with Jerome Fortier (1997)
Percussion Fountain, sound sculpture in collaboration with Stephen Pevnick (1998)
Radiant, Inner Light for speaker, musical saw, metal percussion, percussion fountain, projections and calligrams  Percussion instruments built in collaboration with Stephen Pevnick, calligrams created in collaboration with Marie Mellott, text: Rabbi Naftali Hertz of Bacharach (1998–2000)
Only Gestures, electronic music for a video installation piece by Marie Mellott (2006)
A Noiseless Patient Spider for women's choir or eight solo voices a cappella, dance video version: Peter Sparling, text: Walt Whitman (2010)

Electronic music 
Electronic Music (1964–65). 
"Study #1
"Study #2
"Study #3
"Phonomontage Pour Thérèse"
Milwaukee Brew Project,  environmental tape composition on sounds of Milwaukee (1979)
Three Visions of the Age, collaborative composition for digital synthesizers and instruments with Jon Welstead and Joel Thome (1985)

References

External links
Recorded sound and video samples

Yannay